Hinda Jama Hersi Ganni is a Somali politician currently serving as the Minister of Employment, Social and Family Affairs of Somaliland.

See also

 Ministry of Employment, Social and Family Affairs (Somaliland)
 Politics of Somaliland
 List of Somaliland politicians

References

Peace, Unity, and Development Party politicians
Living people
Government ministers of Somaliland
Year of birth missing (living people)